Oxyna nasuta is a species of fruit fly in the family Tephritidae.

Distribution
Ukraine, Kazakhstan.

References

Tephritinae
Insects described in 1936
Diptera of Asia
Diptera of Europe